Kafirnigania may refer to:
 Kafirnigania (plant), a genus of plants in the family Apiaceae
 Kafirnigania (brachiopod), a fossil genus of brachiopods in the family Dallinidae